Nuno Filipe Sousa Rolão Dias Santos (born 24 September 1976 in Castelo Branco) is a Portuguese retired professional footballer who played as a central defender.

External links

1976 births
Living people
People from Castelo Branco, Portugal
Portuguese footballers
Association football defenders
Liga Portugal 2 players
Segunda Divisão players
Sport Benfica e Castelo Branco players
Leixões S.C. players
Associação Naval 1º de Maio players
Imortal D.C. players
F.C. Barreirense players
S.C. Espinho players
C.D. Pinhalnovense players
Atlético Clube de Portugal players
Sportspeople from Castelo Branco District